The Porter from Maxim's (French: Le Chasseur de chez Maxim's) is a 1953 French comedy film directed by Henri Diamant-Berger and starring Yves Deniaud, Pierre Larquey and Raymond Bussières. It is based on the 1923 play of the same name which has been made into several film adaptations. It was shot at the Neuilly Studios and on location in Paris. The film's sets were designed by the art director Roger Briaucourt.

Synopsis
Julien Pauphilat spent many years working as a porter at the famous Maxim's restaurant in Paris. It proved a very lucrative job and he has now retired and bought a chateau in the countryside. He has always told his daughter he is an industrialist and he has acquired a reputation amongst his new neighbours. However, one of his former regulars at Maxim's now moves to the area and begins courting Julien's daughter, to his discomfort.

Cast

References

Bibliography
 Rearick, Charles. Paris Dreams, Paris Memories: The City and Its Mystique. Stanford University Press, 2011.

External links 
 

1953 films
French comedy films
1950s French-language films
1953 comedy films
Films directed by Henri Diamant-Berger
Films set in Paris
Films shot at Neuilly Studios
French films based on plays
Remakes of French films
French black-and-white films
1950s French films